Countess of Cardigan is a title given to the wife of the Earl of Cardigan. The title has been held by a number of women, including:

Elizabeth Brudenell, Countess of Cardigan (1689–1745)
Mary Montagu, Countess of Cardigan (c.1711–1775)
Elizabeth Brudenell, Countess of Cardigan (1758–1823)
Penelope Brudenell, Countess of Cardigan (1770–1826)
Adeline, Countess of Cardigan and Lancastre (1824–1915)